Poinsettia mosaic virus (PnMV) is a pathogenic plant virus.

External links
 

Tymoviridae
Viral plant pathogens and diseases